"Hinterm Ozean" (en: "Far Beyond the Sea") is a pop song released by German singer and actress Carolin Fortenbacher in 2008. The song was featured on Fortenbacher's second solo album Drama.

"Hinterm Ozean" was released on 29 February 2008, and was produced by Frank Peterson at his Nemo Studio. The song charted at number 44 on the German singles chart.

Eurovision attempt 

On 6 March 2008, "Hinterm Ozean" was one of five competing entries in the Grand Prix Vorentscheid 2008, in which the winning song would become the German entry for the Eurovision Song Contest 2008. She passed the first 4 rounds, beating Marquess, Cinema Bizarre and Tommy Reeve, however in the final selection she lost to No Angels with "Disappear", taking second place with 49.5% of the votes.

Charts

Track listing 
 "Hinterm Ozean" (Radio Version)
 "Hinterm Ozean" (Unplugged version)
 "Hinterm Ozean" (Orchestra version)
 "Far Beyond the Sea" ("Hinterm Ozean" - English version)

References

External links 
 Carolin Fortenbacher
 "Hinterm Ozean" at Amazon.de

2008 songs
2008 singles
Carolin Fortenbacher songs
Song recordings produced by Frank Peterson
Warner Music Group singles
Song articles with missing songwriters